Bradbury Cilley (February 1, 1760 – December 17, 1831) was an American politician and a United States Representative from New Hampshire.

Early life
Born in Nottingham in the Province of New Hampshire, Cilley attended the common schools and then engaged in agricultural pursuits. He served as Moderator for many years for the town of Nottingham: 1788, 1798, 1802, 1807, 1808, 1812, 1813, 1821, 1825 and 1827.

Career
Appointed by President John Adams as United States marshal for the district of New Hampshire on March 19, 1798, Cilley served in that capacity until May 3, 1802.

Elected as a Federalist to the Thirteenth and Fourteenth Congresses, Cilley served as United States Representative At-large for the state of New Hampshire from (March 4, 1813 – March 3, 1817). Active in the militia, he also served as a colonel and aide on the staff of Governor John Taylor Gilman for two years from 1814 to 1816.

Death
Cilley retired from public life and died in Nottingham on December 17, 1831 (age 71 years, 319 days). He is interred in the General Joseph Cilley Burying Ground in Nottingham Square.

Family life
Son of Colonel Joseph and Sara Longfellow, Cilley was the uncle of Jonathan Cilley and Joseph Cilley, both of whom served in the United States Congress in the 19th century. He married Martha "Patty" Poor, daughter of General Enoch Poor, on November 19, 1792.

References

External links

1760 births
1831 deaths
People from Nottingham, New Hampshire
United States Marshals
Federalist Party members of the United States House of Representatives from New Hampshire